Povilla is a genus of mayflies belonging to the family Polymitarcyidae.

The species of this genus are found in Southern Africa.

Species:

Povilla adusta 
Povilla andamanensis 
Povilla cambodjensis 
Povilla heardi 
Povilla junki 
Povilla taprobanes 
Povilla ulmeri

References

Mayflies